The 2020 Labour Party leadership election was a leadership election within Ireland's Labour Party that was triggered when Brendan Howlin stepped down as Labour leader on 12 February 2020, in the aftermath of the party's poor showing at the 2020 general election.

The election was won by Alan Kelly who received 55% of the votes cast.

Background 

Brendan Howlin was elected unopposed as Labour Party leader in a 2016 leadership election. While Labour had a modest gain of six seats in the 2019 local elections, it lost one seat in the 2020 general election, resulting in the party having its lowest ever number of seats in Dáil Éireann with just six TDs elected. Howlin subsequently announced that he would resign as Labour leader stating that it had been "an honour" to lead the party but feels it is time to step down.

Procedure 

The Labour Party Executive Board met in the Gresham Hotel in Dublin on 15 February to agree on the rules for the contest. Only party TDs were eligible for the post of leader, and candidates must have been nominated by either two TDs (they could nominate themselves) or five constituency councils. All members of the party had a vote, provided they had been a paid-up party member since 28 August 2018.

Postal ballot papers were sent to Labour members on 15 March and the closing date for returning votes was on 3 April.  A voter had to be a fully paid-up member for 21 days before polling day - meaning the last day they could sign up was 13 March.

Candidates

Confirmed

Declined 
The following individuals were discussed in the media as potential leadership candidates, but did not stand:
 Seán Sherlock, TD for Cork East, former Minister of State (endorsed Kelly)
 Ged Nash, TD for Louth, former Minister of State (endorsed Ó Ríordáin)

Debates
Several hustings events and public debates were scheduled to take place throughout the leadership campaign; however, as a result of the COVID-19 situation, the Labour Party canceled the remaining hustings in Galway and Dublin.

References

2020 elections in the Republic of Ireland
2020 in Irish politics
Labour Party (Ireland)
Labour Party leadership elections (Ireland)
Labour Party leadership election (Ireland)